Ashmore Group plc is a large British investment manager dedicated to the emerging markets. Headquartered in London, it is listed on the London Stock Exchange and is a constituent of the FTSE 250 Index.

History
The business, which was established by the Australia and New Zealand Banking Group ('ANZ') to manage the ANZ Emerging Markets Liquid Investment Portfolio in 1992, was bought out from ANZ by its management team in 1999. It was the subject of an Initial public offering on the London Stock Exchange in 2006 and it acquired the Virginia-based firm, Emerging Markets Management L.L.C., in 2011.

Operations
The company, which specialises in emerging market investments, had $83.6 billion under management as at 31 December 2020.

References

External links
  Official site
 OTC Markets Group page for Ashmore

 

Companies based in the City of Westminster
Companies listed on the London Stock Exchange
Investment management companies of the United Kingdom